Continuísmo is the practice by incumbents of keeping themselves in office beyond legal term limits for their elected office, often a result of or cause of democratic backsliding and the erosion of human rights. Some Latin American heads of state indefinitely extend their rule by way of reducing or abolishing term limits, via constitutional revision. Examples are Juan Perón in Argentina; Alfredo Stroessner in Paraguay; and Evo Morales in Bolivia. Another tactic is legislative enactment, such as with Jorge Ubico, in Guatemala in 1941. A third tactic is by plebiscite, such as in the cases of Carlos Castillo Armas in Guatemala, Marcos Pérez Jiménez in Venezuela and the 1988 failed attempt by Augusto Pinochet in Chile. A further type is committing a successful self-coup, such as Getúlio Vargas in Brazil. Yet another way is the imposition of a weak successor candidate allowing rule by the outgoing incumbent, as when Emilio Portes Gil and Abelardo Rodríguez in Mexico allowed Plutarco Elías Calles, "el jefe máximo", to continue ruling, a period known as the Maximato. The extension of family rule occurred in Nicaragua with the Somoza family; in Argentina with Juan Perón; and then more recently with  Nestor Kirchner and his wife Cristina Fernández de Kirchner; and in Cuba with Fidel Castro and his brother Raúl Castro. Despite Peru's one-term limit established by its 1979 constitution, Alberto Fujimori illegally extended his rule to ten years through two re-elections.

See also
Caudillo

Further reading
"Continuismo" in Latin American Political Dictionary, edited by Ernest E. Rossi and Jack C. Plano. (1980)
Ebel, Roland H. "Continuismo" in Encyclopedia of Latin American History and Culture, vol. 2, p. 257. New York: Charles Scribner's Sons 1996.
Fitzgibbon, Russell H. "Continuismo" in Central America and the Caribbean," Inter-American Quarterly 2 (July 1940): 56-74/
 Alexander Baturo, Continuismo in Comparison: Avoidance, Extension, and Removal of Presidential Term Limits, DOI:10.1093/oso/9780198837404.003.0005 in  A. Baturo, R. Elgie. The Politics of Presidential Term Limits,

References

Works cited
 

Political terminology
Spanish words and phrases
Latin America
Populism
Democratic backsliding